Mark Farrell (6 May 1953 – 26 November 2018) was a British professional tennis player.

Career
Farrell and Lesley Charles were mixed doubles finalists at the 1974 Wimbledon Championships. In 1974, he was also a losing finalist at a WCT event in London and represented Great Britain in a Davis Cup tie against Iran. He played the doubles rubber with John Lloyd, and they won. Farrell scored a win against Björn Borg at the 1973 NSW Championships. Two years later he scored a victory over Stan Smith at Nottingham.

Grand Slam finals

Mixed doubles: 1 (0–1)

WCT career finals

Doubles: 1 (0–1)

References

1953 births
2018 deaths
English male tennis players
Sportspeople from Liverpool
British male tennis players
Tennis people from Merseyside